140 Grime St is the third studio album by British rapper Kano, released on 29 September 2008 by Bigger Picture Music. The album features guest appearances from Ghetts, Skepta, Wiley and Mikey J, with the latter three all contributing production.

Background
The album came a year after Kano's second studio album, London Town, and after being dropped from 679 Recordings, a record label under Warner Music Group. Kano formed his own label imprint, Bigger Picture Music, deciding to return to a wholly grime approach for 140 Grime St. The album title is a reference to the tempo of grime production and is a continuation of the 'address' theme of his previous albums.

Release and promotion
The first single was the track "Hustler", which Kano described as "the perfect single (as it explains so much)". Other songs from the CD include "Anywhere We Go", "I Like It" and the autobiographical "Aim for the Sky", in which Kano describes his rise to commercial prominence.

As of 2020, the album is unavailable to consume on digital streaming platforms or for purchase via digital download.

Track listing

Charts

References

2008 albums
Kano (rapper) albums
Albums produced by Wiley (rapper)
Albums produced by DaVinChe